Audra is an unincorporated community in Barbour County, West Virginia, United States.

Audra State Park is located at Audra on the Middle Fork River.

Notable person
William Smith O'Brien (1862–1948), U.S. Congressman, was born in Audra.

See also
Audra State Park

References

Unincorporated communities in Barbour County, West Virginia
Unincorporated communities in West Virginia